This is a list of events in Scottish television from 1953.

Events
2 June – The Coronation of Queen Elizabeth II is televised in the United Kingdom. Sales of TV sets rise sharply in the weeks leading up to the event. It is also one of the earliest broadcasts to be deliberately recorded for posterity. It still exists in its entirety today.

Births
11 January - John Sessions, actor
27 February - Gavin Esler, author and BBC television journalist
7 June - Dougie Donnelly, television broadcaster
23 June – John Stahl, actor (died 2022)
31 August - Jimmy McKenna, actor
8 September - John McGlynn, actor

See also
1953 in Scotland

References

 
 
1950s in Scottish television